Sanhe is a town of west-central Shizhu Tujia Autonomous County in eastern Chongqing Municipality, People's Republic of China, located  northeast of the county seat as the crow flies. , it has 3 residential communities and 10 villages under its administration.

References

Towns in Chongqing
Divisions of Shizhu Tujia Autonomous County